Mount Wood is the highest summit in the Granite Range, a subrange of the Beartooth Mountains in the U.S. state of Montana. It is located within the Custer National Forest.

References

Wood
Mountains of Stillwater County, Montana